Sepen is a Ramu language of Yawar Rural LLG, Madang Province, Papua New Guinea. Speakers prefer the name Akukem.

References

Misegian languages
Languages of Madang Province